The 1920 United States presidential election in Nebraska took place on November 2, 1920, as part of the 1920 United States presidential election which was held throughout all contemporary 48 states. Voters chose eight representatives, or electors to the Electoral College, who voted for president and vice president.

Nebraska voted strongly for Republican nominee, Senator Warren G. Harding of Ohio, over the Democratic nominee, Governor James M. Cox of Ohio. Harding ran with Governor Calvin Coolidge of Massachusetts, while Cox ran with Assistant Secretary of the Navy Franklin D. Roosevelt of New York. Harding won every county in the state, although the trend – dramatic as it was – was substantially smaller than Harding's landslides in heavily German-American North and South Dakota.

Results

Results by county

See also
 United States presidential elections in Nebraska

Notes

References

Nebraska
1920
1920 Nebraska elections